Events in the year 2020 in Ukraine.

Incumbents
President: Volodymyr Zelenskyy
Prime Minister: Oleksiy Honcharuk (until 4 March), Denys Shmygal (from 4 March)

Events
Ongoing – War in Donbass

January 
8 January – Ukraine International Airlines Flight 752, a scheduled international passenger flight from Tehran to Kyiv, was shot down shortly after takeoff from Tehran Imam Khomeini International Airport by the Iranian Islamic Revolutionary Guards Corp, killing all 176 passengers and crew on board.

February 
 8 & 15 February – Ukraine was originally planned to participate in the Eurovision Song Contest 2020, after a year break, but the contest was cancelled.
18 February – Russian-backed separatists launched an attack near Krymske, Novoaidar Raion, Luhansk Oblast, attempting to overrun an entrenched Ukrainian position. The attack, the first of its kind in two years, killed one Ukrainian soldier and injured four others.

April 
6 April – A series of wildfires began burning inside Ukraine's Chernobyl Exclusion Zone. The fires were largely extinguished within two weeks and at least one suspect was arrested in connection with the event.

July 
 21 July – A hostage situation took place in Lutsk, Volyn Oblast when Maksym Kryvosh seized a BAZ A079 bus and barricaded himself and 13 passengers inside at the Teatralna Square. The crisis was eventually resolved with the release of the hostages and Kryvosh's arrest.

December 
 17 December – Mayor Hennadiy Kernes of Kharkiv dies in Germany due to complications caused by COVID-19 after contracting the virus in September.
 24 December – The country surpasses one million cases of COVID-19.

Deaths

January
1 January – Aleksandr Manachinsky, swimmer (b. 1958).
30 January – Vitaliy Boiko, lawyer and diplomat (b. 1937).

February
3 February – Valentyna Shevchenko, politician (b. 1935).
4 February – Volodymyr Inozemtsev, triple jumper (b. 1964).
15 February – Mykola Bondar, figure skater (b. 1990).
28 February – Gennady Kuzmin, chess player (b. 1946).

March
6 March – Stanislav Bogdanovich, chess player (b. 1993).

April
 27 April – Pavlyna Shapovalenko, milking machine operator (b. 1949).

June
 16 June – Lyudmyla Lyatetska, paediatrician (b. 1941).

July
30 July – Oksana Voronina, actress (b. 1967).

December
 29 December – Yevheniia Kucherenko, pedagogue (b. 1922).

References

 
Ukraine
Ukraine
2020s in Ukraine
Years of the 21st century in Ukraine